Ezequiel Francisco Orozco Padilla (23 November 1988 – 16 March 2018) was a Mexican professional football forward who last played for Murciélagos in the Ascenso MX.
In November 2016, Orozco was diagnosed with lung cancer, suspending his football career to have treatment. He died on 16 March 2018 at the age of 29.

References

External links

1988 births
2018 deaths
Club Necaxa footballers
Chiapas F.C. footballers
Atlante F.C. footballers
Footballers from Sinaloa
Mexican footballers
People from Los Mochis
Association football forwards
Deaths from lung cancer
Deaths from cancer in Mexico